Cesare Goffi (May 5, 1920 in Turin – February 20, 1995 in Turin) is a retired Italian professional footballer who played as a goalkeeper.

Honours
Juventus
 Coppa Italia winner: 1941–42.

See also
Football in Italy
List of football clubs in Italy

References

External links
 inmiamemoria

1920 births
1995 deaths
Italian footballers
Serie A players
Casale F.B.C. players
Cosenza Calcio 1914 players
Juventus F.C. players
Calcio Padova players
Catania S.S.D. players
A.S.D. Calcio Ivrea players
Association football goalkeepers
A.S.D. La Biellese players